is the popular name of , a Buddhist temple in Kawasaki, Japan. Founded in 1128, it is the headquarters of the Chizan sect of Shingon Buddhism. Kawasaki Daishi is a popular temple for hatsumōde (the first visit to a place of worship in the new year).  In 2006, 2.72 million people engaged in hatsumōde here, the third largest figure in Japan and the largest in Kanagawa Prefecture. In 2016, the temple made preparations to receive 3 million visitors over the same period. Keihin Electric Express Railway, the oldest railroad company in the Kantō region of Japan, commenced service in January 1899 to carry passengers to Kawasaki Daishi from Tokyo.

References

External links 
 About Kawasaki Daishi

Buddhist temples in Kanagawa Prefecture
Buildings and structures in Kawasaki, Kanagawa